Mark Strippel was the Head of Content Commissioning at BBC Radio 1Xtra  and BBC Asian Network.

He joined the BBC in 2003 as a DJ on BBC Radio 1Xtra and was part of the original launch line-up, staying until 2007 when he moved into a management role as Head of Music at BBC Asian Network.

In 2017 he was given responsibility for BBC Radio 1Xtra in a leadership role.

He is responsible for strategic direction, content commissioning and talent for BBC Radio 1Xtra with signings including Kenny Allstar, Snoochie Shy, Sir Spyro, Reece Parkinson, Nadia Jae, Big Zuu, Jeremiah Asiamah and Moses Boyd.

In 2018 he defended the BBC's responsibility to play Drill music, highlighting the need to balance “a commitment to UK music and the scene with a duty of care to audiences.” 

In late 2018 Strippel signed Tiffany Calver as the new face of the 1Xtra Rap Show, Europe's biggest Hip-Hop radio platform.

Strippel was born in Hounslow, West London and studied at Lampton School, Queen Mary and Westfield and the University of Law.

In 2001 he was a founding member of Panjabi Hit Squad. The group were signed to Def Jam UK, leading to remixes for  Ashanti, Mariah Carey, Beenie Man and various compilation albums.

References

External links 
Markie Mark Biography at BBC Press Office
Markie Mark appointment as Head of Music at BBC Asian Network - BBC Press Office

1974 births
Living people
BBC Asian Network